Kim Bong-Za  (born 19 October 1943) is a former North Korean female cross-country skier. She represented North Korea at the 1964 Winter Olympics in the women's 10 km cross-country skiing event.

References

External links 
 

1943 births
Living people
North Korean female cross-country skiers
Olympic cross-country skiers of North Korea
Cross-country skiers at the 1964 Winter Olympics